Walter Humphreys may refer to:
 Walter Humphreys Sr., English cricketer
 Walter Humphreys Jr., English cricketer